Type 632 tanker is a type of naval auxiliary ship currently in service with the People's Republic of China Navy (PLAN). Designed as a type that is capable of transporting both water and oil, these ships entered service from 1972 onward. Type 632 tanker has received the NATO reporting name as Fulin class. These ships had all retired by the late 2010s.

Type 632 tankers in PLAN service are designated by a combination of two Chinese characters followed by a three-digit number. The second Chinese character is You (油), meaning oil in Chinese, or Shui (水), meaning water, because these ships are classified either as oil or water tankers. The first Chinese character denotes which fleet the ship is in service with, with East (Dong, 东) for East Sea Fleet, North (Bei, 北) for North Sea Fleet, and South (Nan, 南) for South Sea Fleet. However, the pennant numbers may have changed due to the change in Chinese naval ships naming convention.

References

Auxiliary ships of the People's Liberation Army Navy
Auxiliary transport ship classes